The revealed frog, whirring tree frog, or orange-thighed treefrog (Litoria revelata) is a species of tree frog native to coastal eastern Australia.

Description
This frog reaches  in length. It is cream to red-brown on the back, with a darker band running down the middle. Males turn bright yellow in colour during the breeding season. A dark strip runs from the nostril to the shoulder, across the tympanum. The back of the legs are red and the thigh is yellow-orange. Some large black dots occur on the thigh and the backs of the legs. The belly is cream and the iris is golden.

Distribution and habitat 
It is distributed in four separate populations. Two populations occur exclusively in Queensland; these are the most northern population in Atherton Tableland in northern Queensland; another population occurs in the Clarke Range in mid-northern Queensland, and a population is found on the border of Queensland and New South Wales. This population is from Ballina, New South Wales, to Tamborine National Park, Queensland. The most southern population, also the largest, occurs in mid-northern New South Wales. This population is distributed between Ourimbah in the south and the Myall Lakes National Park in the north, also a population occurs around Port Macquarie, but this is part of the southern population. These four populations may represent more than one species. This species is associated with dam impoundments, ditches, swamps, and still areas of streams in heathland, wet or dry sclerophyll forest, and rainforest.

Ecology and behaviour

Males make a high-pitched whirring noise, similar to the Verreaux's tree frog; calling occurs from spring to autumn, either from the ground or from vegetation bordering the breeding area.

References

Further reading 
 Anstis, M. 2002. Tadpoles of South-eastern Australia. Reed New Holland: Sydney.
 Robinson, M. 2002. A Field Guide to Frogs of Australia. Australian Museum/Reed New Holland: Sydney.

External links 
 Frogs Australia Network-frog call available here.

Litoria
Frogs of Australia
Amphibians of Queensland
Amphibians of New South Wales
Endemic fauna of Australia
Amphibians described in 1982
Taxa named by William Hosmer (herpetologist)
Taxa named by Glen Joseph Ingram